A micro data center (MDC) is a smaller or containerized (modular) data center architecture that is designed for computer workloads not requiring traditional facilities. Whereas the size may vary from rack to container, a micro data center may include fewer than four servers in a single 19-inch rack. It may come with built-in security systems, cooling systems, and fire protection. Typically there are standalone rack-level systems containing all the components of a 'traditional' data center, including in-rack cooling, power supply, power backup, security, fire and suppression. Designs exist where energy is conserved by means of temperature chaining, in combination with liquid cooling.

In mid-2017, technology introduced by the DOME project was demonstrated enabling 64 high-performance servers, storage, networking, power and cooling to be integrated in a 2U 19" rack-unit. This packaging, sometimes called 'datacenter-in-a-box' allows deployments in spaces where traditional data centers do not fit, such as factory floors (IOT) and dense city centers, especially for edge-computing and edge-analytics.

MDCs are typically portable and provide plug and play features. They can be rapidly deployed indoors or outdoors, in remote locations, for a branch office, or for temporary use in high-risk zones. They enable distributed workloads, minimizing downtime and increasing speed of  response.

Micro data center technology is being utilized to address much of the increased data production being fueled by use of IoT devices and AI. These require data analysis and action without latency in order for instant reactions, such as needed by smart devices and the evolution of self-driving cars. Governments around the world are using MDC technology to create the basis for smart cities, pioneering efforts to reduce climate change and increase the quality of life for the vast majority of human life that inhabits urban areas.

Trials for MDC’s began at the beginning of 2010 for a viable data storage solution that could work in even the most remote or hostile of environments. Since then, MDC use has become more widespread across multiple industries as a key element of edge deployments.  

The micro data center offers a viable alternative to traditional cloud storage and the carbon footprint this brings. With the rise in smart devices, 5G and other data requirements, carbon emissions from data alone are expected to account for 3.2% of the entire global output, rising to 14% by 2040. The technology also lends itself to environmental considerations, being more energy efficient, with a lower PUE, than traditional data centers and on-site server rooms.

See also
 DOME MicroDataCenter

References

Data centers